Protein ECT2 is a protein that in humans is encoded by the ECT2 gene.

Function 

The protein encoded by this gene is a transforming protein that is related to Rho-specific exchange factors and yeast cell cycle regulators. The expression of this gene is elevated with the onset of DNA synthesis and remains elevated during G2 and M phases. In situ hybridization analysis showed that expression is at a high level in cells undergoing mitosis in regenerating liver. Thus, this protein is expressed in a cell cycle-dependent manner during liver regeneration, and is thought to have an important role in the regulation of cytokinesis.

Interactions 

ECT2 has been shown to interact with PARD6A.

References

Further reading